Habrodera is a genus of beetles in the family Cicindelidae, containing the following species:

 Habrodera capensis (Linnaeus, 1764)
 Habrodera leucoptera (Dejean, 1831)
 Habrodera nilotica (Dejean, 1825)
 Habrodera nitidula (Dejean, 1825)
 Habrodera owas (Bates, 1878)
 Habrodera truncatilabris (Fairmaire, 1897)

References

Cicindelidae